Biameh-ye Olya (also Romanized as Bīāmeh-ye ‘Olyā; also known as Beyāmeh-ye ‘Olyā and Bīāmeh-ye Bālā) is a village in Qalkhani Rural District, Gahvareh District, Dalahu County, Kermanshah Province, Iran. At the 2006 census, its population was 187, in 42 families.

References 

Populated places in Dalahu County